Harjit Singh Grewal is an Indian politician and member of Bhartiya Janta Party. He is one of the senior leaders of the Bhartiya Janta Party. He served as the State Vice President of the Bhartiya Janta Party of the Punjab. He is currently serving as a member of the National Executive of the Bhartiya Janata Party.

Political career 
Harjit Singh Grewal played a key role in the farmers' protest. Grewal met the Prime Minister as well as the Union Home Minister on several occasions to resolve the issue of the farmers' protest. He also remained as the Chairman of Khadi Board. He was one of the Star Campaigners for BJP in Punjab for  the 2022 Punjab Assembly Elections. He contested the Punjab Legislative Assembly Elections in 2017 from Rajpura.

During the farmers' protest, Grewal advised the SGPC that being a purely religious body, by getting involved into the farmers’ agitation, the SGPC is going completely against the mandate given to it under The Sikh Gurdwaras Act, 1925 and Punjab Act 8 of 1925 that describe the prime role of the SGPC to manage gurdwara affairs.

During the farmers' protest Grewal was a part of the committee that was made to discuss the issues of the farmers' protest.

When Prime Minister Narendra Modi's security was breached in Punjab, Grewal claimed that windows of some buses were smashed and some workers were beaten up who were coming to attend the rally of the Prime Minister.

In November 2021, Grewal was amongst the BJP leaders who met the Prime Minister seeking to reopen the Kartarpur corridor before the Gurpurab.

In the month of July, 2021 some farmers entered Grewal's fields and destroyed the paddy saplings transplanted on 1.5 acres of land in Dhanaula, Barnala. An FIR was registered against the farmers who were involved in destroying the paddy saplings.

References

External links 
 

Living people
Bharatiya Janata Party politicians from Punjab
People from Barnala district
Indian politicians
Indian Sikhs
Punjabi people
Year of birth missing (living people)